Epischnia castillella is a species of snout moth in the genus Epischnia. It was described by Ragonot in 1894, and is known from Spain and Morocco.

References

Moths described in 1894
Phycitini